Double X may refer to:

Double X (album), a 2006 album by Bonfire
Double X (feminist art collective)
Double X: The Name of the Game, a 1992 British thriller film
Doctor Double X, a DC Comics villain
Double X, a musical group consisting of Alexander Kowalski and Torsten Litschko
Double X, a nickname for baseball player Jimmie Foxx
Slate magazine podcasts The Waves, women's issues, formerly DoubleX

See also 
Dos Equis
X (disambiguation)
XX (disambiguation)
Double X Posse, a 1990s rap group